FC Lukhovitsy is a Russian football team from Lukhovitsy. It played professionally in 1968–1969 and 1997–2008. Their best result was 3rd place in Zone Center of the Russian Second Division in 2007 and 2008. As of 2009, they play in the Amateur Football League, where they were relegated to because of financial difficulties.

Team name history
 1968–1991: FC Spartak Lukhovitsy
 1992–1993: FC Sokol Lukhovitsy
 1994–2006: FC Spartak Lukhovitsy
 2007–present: FC Lukhovitsy

External links
  Team history at KLISF

Association football clubs established in 1968
Football clubs in Russia
Football in Moscow Oblast
1968 establishments in Russia